Ostan may refer to:

OS-tan, Internet personifications of operating systems
Ostan (Geography), Iranian name for "province"
Ostan or Óstán, Irish word for "hotel", which may be seen around Ireland
Spring festival in Austria, 2 days after Easter
Polish name for "Go with God"
Ostan, Old High German word for "dawn"
Östan, Swedish word meaning "East wind"